Mary Sarah Bilder is an American historian, and a winner of the 2016 Bancroft Prize.

Life
She graduated from the University of Wisconsin–Madison, Harvard Law School, and Harvard University. She taught at Columbia Law School, Harvard Law School, and teaches at Boston College Law School.

Works

 Female Genius: Eliza Harriot and George Washington at the Dawn of the Constitution. University of Virginia Press, 2022.

Honors
2016 - Bancroft Prize for Madison's Hand: Revising the Constitutional Convention

References

External links

http://historynewsnetwork.org/article/160614

Living people
Harvard Law School alumni
University of Wisconsin–Madison alumni
Place of birth missing (living people)
Columbia Law School faculty
Year of birth missing (living people)
21st-century American historians
Bancroft Prize winners